Satellite Reign is a cyberpunk real-time tactics video game that was released in August 2015 for Windows, macOS, and Linux. The game was developed by Australia's 5 Lives Studios and is a spiritual successor to the Syndicate series, which co-founder and programmer Mike Diskett had worked on. The name derived from one of the weapons featured in Syndicate Wars called "Satellite Rain."

Development

After the release of the Syndicate reboot in 2012, the Syndicate Wars producer and lead programmer, Mike Diskett, expressed his displeasure over the game's lack of similarity to previous entries in the series:"A lot of Syndicate fans, including myself, got our hopes up when we heard a new Syndicate game was in development, but in the end it turned out to be nothing like the original games."This encouraged him to create the Brisbane-based 5 Lives Studios (which included team members who had worked on other video game series such as Grand Theft Auto, L.A. Noire, and Darksiders) and develop a spiritual successor to the game he made back in 1993:"I've decided to take it upon myself to deliver what the fans really wanted."Unlike the reboot, which was a first-person shooter, 5 Lives Studios tried to build upon the real-time tactics gameplay experience found in the original games by introducing a fixed camera system and character classes.

The game was released for Windows, macOS, and Linux on August 28, 2015. A post-launch update introducing four-player cooperative gameplay was released in July 2016.

The soundtrack was composed by Russell Shaw, who worked on both Syndicate and Syndicate Wars.

Plot
Satellite Reign takes place in an unnamed fictional city referred to as "The City".  A corporation named Dracogenics rises to prominence after releasing a prototype named Resurrection-Tech that is capable of providing immortality. Dracogenics turns to corporate crime and bribes politicians with immortality in exchange for control and influence. This eventually leads to the privatization of The City's services and full corporate control over The City's police force. Civil unrest arises and is suppressed by Dracogenics, but a rival corporation soon comes to light and launches anti-Dracogenics attacks. The player controls this rival corporation and must overthrow Dracogenics from The City.

Reception

Satellite Reign has a score of 75 out of 100 on Metacritic indicating "generally favorable reviews".

References

External links

2015 video games
Crowdfunded video games
Cyberpunk video games
Kickstarter-funded video games
Linux games
Open-world video games
Organized crime video games
MacOS games
Real-time tactics video games
Science fiction video games
Steam Greenlight games
Video games developed in Australia
Video games scored by Russell Shaw
Windows games